The Tunisian Internet Agency, known by its acronym ATI (short for Agence tunisienne d'Internet) and created on 12 March 1996, is the principal Tunisian ISP.  It is run by the Ministry of Communications and has an equal mission to promote Internet usage in that country.

The ATI also has the task of contributing to the installation of networks in various fields (health, education and agriculture), to manage the national network and domain name (.tn) to launch websites and organize trainings and workshops.

Its customers are other ISPs, government agencies, state-run firms, research centres, etc.  The ATI can thus regulate the entire national network because, except for public ISPs such as Tunisie Telecom, the 5 private suppliers Orange Tunisia, 3S Global Net, HexaByte, Ooredoo Tunisia and Topnet depend on it for the network's management.

See also 

 Censorship in Tunisia
 Internet censorship in Tunisia

External links
 Tunisian Internet Agency official site

Companies established in 1996
Communications in Tunisia
Internet service providers of Africa
Internet in Tunisia
Government-owned companies of Tunisia